Jaime Arturo "Jimmy" Lozano Espín (born 29 September 1978) is a Mexican professional football manager and former player who played as a midfielder.

Lozano spent the majority of his playing career with Club Universidad Nacional, playing in over 160 matches with the club. He also had spells with Tigres UANL and Cruz Azul, and Monarcas Morelia.

A Mexico international, Lozano made his debut in 2000, earning 34 caps and scoring 12 goals during a seven-year period. He participated with the national team in various competitions, including two Copa América tournaments, the 2005 FIFA Confederations Cup, and the 2007 CONCACAF Gold Cup.

Club career
He debuted with Pumas UNAM in 1998, and until 2001, when he moved to Celaya to play for a team that then contested in the Primera División (First Division), but has since been relegated. In 2002, he returned to Pumas where he won the Mexican Championship twice. After that, Lozano had problems renewing his contract for the following tournament and became a free agent. He signed on with Tigres UANL for the next two years.

International career

Mexico national team
Lozano was called up to the Mexico national team many times; he made three appearances for Mexico in the team's fourth-place finish at the 2005 FIFA Confederations Cup, and eleven games in the 2006 FIFA World Cup qualifiers. A series of injuries kept him away from the team in the months leading up to the World Cup. Nevertheless, Lozano was named by Ricardo La Volpe in a provisional list of 26 players. However, he performed poorly and did not make the final list.

Lozano was one of the players selected by Hugo Sánchez to compete in the Copa América 2007. He made his first appearance in the tournament coming on as a substitute during Mexico's 2–0 victory over Brazil.

Career statistics

International goals

Managerial career

Querétaro
After winning the U-20 Clausura Liga MX title with Querétaro FC's U-20 team, Lozano was promoted to be an assistant coach at Querétaro's senior team under Víctor Manuel Vucetich.

After Vucetich was sacked on January 31, 2017, Lozano was appointed manager. On July 16, Lozano won his first career title as a manager when Querétaro defeated América 2–0 to clinch the 2017 Supercopa MX. On October 22, Lozano was sacked after a poor run of form which left Querétaro in last place, being replaced by Luis Fernando Tena.

Mexico U23
On 18 December 2018, Lozano was named manager of the Mexico U-23 national team.

At the 2019 Toulon Tournament, Lozano took the team to a third-place finish, defeating the Republic of Ireland in a penalty shoot-out 4–3 following a scoreless draw. Disputing the Pan American Games the following month, he led the team to a third-place finish, defeating Uruguay 1–0, receiving the bronze medal.

Managerial statistics

Honours

Player
UNAM
Mexican Primera División: Clausura 2004, Apertura 2004
Campeón de Campeones: 2004

Individual
Mexican Primera División Best Full-back: 2003–04
Mexican Primera División Best Attacking Midfielder: Apertura 2009

Manager
Querétaro
Supercopa MX: 2017

Mexico U23
Pan American Bronze Medal: 2019
CONCACAF Olympic Qualifying Championship: 2020
Olympic Bronze Medal: 2020

Personal life
During the peak of his career, he was featured on the North American cover of EA Sports' 2006 FIFA World Cup game. Lozano did not make the final roster that participated at the World Cup causing EA Sports to avoid adding any players on any future cover art. He is the son of Mexican actress Ana Bertha Espín.

References

External links

 

1978 births
Living people
Mexico international footballers
2004 Copa América players
2005 FIFA Confederations Cup players
2007 CONCACAF Gold Cup players
2007 Copa América players
Footballers from Mexico City
Cruz Azul footballers
Liga MX players
Club Universidad Nacional footballers
Tigres UANL footballers
Atlético Morelia players
Association football midfielders
Mexican footballers
Mexican football managers